Asieh Namdar (born 1967) is an Iranian American journalist and television presenter. She is currently an anchor for CGTN America in Washington, D.C.

Early and personal life
Namdar was born to parents of Iranian origin in Karachi in 1967, and grew up in Tehran, Iran. Following the Iranian Revolution in 1979, her family moved to the United States. Namdar graduated from the University of California at Berkeley with a bachelor's degree in communications. She is fluent in Persian. Asieh is married and has two daughters, Leila and Roya.

Career
Having joined CNN in 1989 as a video journalist, Asieh has held many positions, including producing her own segment, reporting on the Middle East conflict, the civil war in Northern Uganda, the wars in Afghanistan and Iraq and interviewing world leaders such as the late Benazir Bhutto, Pakistan's former Prime Minister. In 2004, she traveled to Iran to report on the Bam earthquake. Namdar also anchored, wrote and produced the daily CNN Headline News segment "The Global Minute".

Namdar has been recognized for her work by many Iranian-American organizations.

References

CNN people
Living people
Iranian emigrants to the United States
American Shia Muslims
Iranian expatriates in Pakistan
People from Karachi
People from Tehran
1967 births
Exiles of the Iranian Revolution in the United States
China Global Television Network people
CCTV newsreaders and journalists